Eupithecia strattonata is a moth in the family Geometridae. It is found from Newfoundland and Labrador and Nova Scotia to Ontario and bordering areas in the north-eastern United States. The habitat consists of damp fields and open areas, abandoned pastures, marshes, bogs or other flat wet areas.

The wingspan is about 17 mm. The forewings are dull rusty or reddish-brown beyond the post medial line and in the basal area. The median area is slightly more greyish. The hindwings are similar to the forewings but slightly paler basally. Adults are on wing in June and July.

The larvae feed on Alnus and Spiraea species. One individual larva was reared on the fruit of Actaea rubra.

References

Moths described in 1873
strattonata
Moths of North America